Jiang Jialiang (born March 3, 1964) is a male former international table tennis player from China. He competed at the 1988 Summer Olympics.

Table tennis career
From 1982 to 1989 he won many medals in singles, doubles, and team events in the Asian Table Tennis Championships, in the Table Tennis World Cup, and in the World Table Tennis Championships. Since his retirement, Jiang has served as a color commentator for table tennis sporting events on Hong Kong television station TVB.

The ten World Championship medals included five gold medals; two in the men's singles at the 1985 World Table Tennis Championships and 1987 World Table Tennis Championships and three in the men's team event.

ITTF Legends Tour
In 2014 and 2015, Jiang participated in the ITTF Legend Tour which featured table tennis legends such as Jan-Ove Waldner, Jean-Michel Saive and Jean-Philippe Gatien.

See also
 List of table tennis players
 List of World Table Tennis Championships medalists

References

1964 births
Living people
Chinese male table tennis players
Table tennis players from Guangdong
People from Zhongshan
Asian Games medalists in table tennis
Table tennis players at the 1986 Asian Games
Olympic table tennis players of China
Table tennis players at the 1988 Summer Olympics
Medalists at the 1986 Asian Games
Asian Games silver medalists for China